Guánica Light was a historic lighthouse located in the town of  Guánica, Puerto Rico in the Guánica State Forest. It was first lit in 1893 and deactivated in 1950. The light marked  the entrance to Guánica Bay and bridge the gap between Los Morrillos Light and Caja de Muertos Light. 

On July 25, 1898, lighthouse keeper Robustiano Rivera spotted the convoy of the American forces that initiated the landing offensive of the Puerto Rican Campaign during the Spanish–American War. He immediately gave the alert to the residents of Guánica and marched to Yauco where he broke the news of the invading forces to the city's mayor.

By 2009, the lighthouse was practically in ruins, though some parts of its unique architectural elements were still visible. It was listed in the U.S. National Register of Historic Places in 1981.

A series of earthquakes that occurred in January 2020 in Puerto Rico further damaged the Guánica lighthouse.

See also
 List of lighthouses in Puerto Rico

Notes

References

External links

Historic American Engineering Record in Puerto Rico
Lighthouses completed in 1893
Lighthouses on the National Register of Historic Places in Puerto Rico
Guánica, Puerto Rico
Octagonal buildings
1893 establishments in Puerto Rico
Ruins
Unused buildings in Puerto Rico